The 2022 FIVB Volleyball Men's Challenger Cup qualification was a series of tournaments to decide teams which played in the 2022 FIVB Volleyball Men's Challenger Cup. The 2022 Challenger Cup featured 8 teams. Only one place was allocated to the hosts. The remaining 7 places were determined by a qualification process, in which entrants from among the other teams from the five FIVB confederations competed.

Qualification summary
A total of 8 teams qualified for the tournament.

Means of qualification

Continental qualification tournaments

AVC (Asia and Oceania)
FIVB selected Qatar to represent the AVC for the 2022 Challenger Cup via the FIVB World Ranking as of 31 March 2022.

CAVB (Africa)
FIVB selected Tunisia to represent the CAVB for the 2022 Challenger Cup via the FIVB World Ranking as of 31 March 2022.

CEV (Europe)

Final venue:  SC Lange Munte, Kortrijk, Belgium
Date: 28 May – 20 June 2021
The top team qualified for the 2022 Challenger Cup.

Final venue:  Varaždin Arena, Varaždin, Croatia
Date: 25 May – 19 June 2022
The top team qualified for the 2022 Challenger Cup.

CSV (South America)
FIVB selected Chile to represent the CSV for the 2022 Challenger Cup via the FIVB World Ranking as of 31 March 2022.

NORCECA (North, Central America and Caribbean)
FIVB selected Cuba to represent the NORCECA for the 2022 Challenger Cup via the FIVB World Ranking as of 31 March 2022.

References

FIVB Volleyball Men's Challenger Cup qualification